I Want a Famous Face is a reality television program on MTV, produced by Pink Sneakers Productions.

The show features young adults who undergo plastic surgery with the goal of looking more like a famous person.  Celebrities that participants have chosen to look more like include Pamela Anderson, Jennifer Lopez, Jessica Simpson, Britney Spears, Brad Pitt, Ricky Martin and Victoria Beckham.

The show also features short spots on how plastic surgery can go wrong from people that have experienced poor health resulting from their attempts at plastic surgery.

External links
Episode Guide

MTV original programming
2004 American television series debuts
2004 American television series endings
2000s American reality television series
Television series about plastic surgery